Vladimir Krstić (born 5 April 1959) is a Yugoslav rower. He competed in the men's coxed four event at the 1980 Summer Olympics. Prior to the Olympics, he won a bronze medal at the 1979 Mediterranean Games.

References

1959 births
Living people
Yugoslav male rowers
Olympic rowers of Yugoslavia
Rowers at the 1980 Summer Olympics
Place of birth missing (living people)
Mediterranean Games bronze medalists for Yugoslavia
Mediterranean Games medalists in rowing
Competitors at the 1979 Mediterranean Games